Conquest of Cheyenne is a 1946 American Western film in the Red Ryder film series directed by R. G. Springsteen and written by Earle Snell. The film stars Wild Bill Elliott, Robert Blake, Alice Fleming, Peggy Stewart, Jay Kirby, and Milton Kibbee. The film was released on July 29, 1946, by Republic Pictures.

Plot
Red Ryder helps to bring in an oil well on a ranch owned by Jackson, after Tom Dean found oil in the ranch. However, Tuttle sets the well on fire in an effort to get the ranch foreclosed.

Cast  
Wild Bill Elliott as Red Ryder 
Robert Blake as Little Beaver 
Alice Fleming as Duchess
Peggy Stewart as Cheyenne Jackson
Jay Kirby as Tom Dean
Milton Kibbee as Banker Tuttle
Tom London as Sheriff Dan Perkins
Emmett Lynn as Daffy
Kenne Duncan as Geologist McBride
George Sherwood as Murdo
Frank McCarroll as Henchman Long
Jack Kirk as Deputy Blake
Tom Chatterton as Rancher Jones

References

External links 
 

1946 films
American Western (genre) films
1946 Western (genre) films
Republic Pictures films
Films directed by R. G. Springsteen
Films based on comic strips
Films based on American comics
American black-and-white films
Films with screenplays by Joseph F. Poland
1940s English-language films
1940s American films
Red Ryder films